The Porsche Type 573 engine is a naturally-aspirated, flat-eight racing engine, designed by Porsche for Formula One racing; and used for a single season in 1962 in the 1½ litre formula.

Background
In October 1958, the FIA announced another change to the regulations for Formula One. Beginning in the 1961 season, engine capacity would be limited to the same 1.5 litres as in Formula Two. This meant that Porsche could use their F2 cars almost unchanged in F1.

For 1961 Porsche launched the Type 787. The car had a new chassis that was longer than that of the 718/2 by an additional  to accommodate the Type 753 flat-eight engine in development. While it kept the earlier car's rear suspension, at the front was a new upper and lower A-arm suspension with coil springs. The first chassis completed was powered by a 547/3 four-cylinder engine with Kugelfischer fuel injection. At the Monaco Grand Prix the car retired when the fuel injection cut out. A second car, also fitted with the 547/3 engine, was completed in time to appear in the Dutch Grand Prix alongside the other 787. The cars placed 10th and 11th, but their lack of power and poor handling caused Ferry Porsche to retire the model.

Porsche would focus on building a brand new competitive formula race car with an eight-cylinder engine.

Like the Porsche 787 before it, the 804 engine had a smoother surface than its predecessor, which was achieved in part by using a horizontal cooling fan (vertical axis) on top of the new flat-eight engine, in contrast to the vertically-mounted (horizontal axis) cooling fan used on the four-cylinder Fuhrmann engine.

Engine
The design of the new Type 753 flat-eight engine for F1 was handled by Hans Hönick and Hans Mezger. The engine continued the Porsche traditions of a boxer layout and air-cooling.

The oversquare dimensions kept piston speeds low, and kept the engine narrow and as far out of the airflow on the sides of the car's tub as possible, although it was still wider than the 120° V6 and 90° V8s of the competition.

A prototype engine was first started on a test-bench on 12 December 1960. That first 753 only produced  (some sources say ).

During the development of the 804, there were concerns about the readiness of the eight-cylinder engine, so the second chassis, 804-02, was modified to accept the air-cooled 1.5-liter four-cylinder boxer engine type 547 from the 787. That chassis was later converted back to the eight-cylinder configuration. It was never raced with the four-cylinder engine.

Swiss racing driver, engineer, and fuel injection specialist Michael May transferred from Mercedes Benz to Porsche to work on the 753 engine, but wound up developing improvements for the 547/3 engine instead. May's changes included reducing the oil pressure, removing two of the engines five piston rings, using a new hardening process on the built-up Hirth crankshaft, narrowing the inlet ports, modifying the piston crowns and valve depth, using direct fuel injection, and adding a second non-drive fan impeller below the driven one. The cam profiles were unchanged. May felt that the 547/3B could win Formula One races, and showed Porsche's engineers that the 804 chassis could be modified to take the four-cylinder. He then struck an agreement with Ferry Porsche to have a 547/3B installed in a 718/2 that May would personally drive in practice at the 1962 Pau Grand Prix. When the car failed to arrive at Pau, May left Porsche for Ferrari. Only three 547/3B engines were ever built.

With a compression ratio of 10.0:1, the 753 flat-eight engine produced  at 9200 rpm on its first outing. This was still less power than the new Coventry-Climax and BRM V8 engines.

Type 753
The first Porsche flat-eight was the Type 753. Work began on it in 1960, following the announcement of a 1.5-litre displacement limit for the 1961 Formula One (F1) season. The design of the new F1 engine was done by Hans Hönick and Hans Mezger. The 753 inherited the traditional Porsche features of a boxer layout and air-cooling, but the number of cylinders increased to eight.

The oversquare dimensions kept piston speeds low, and also kept the engine narrow and as far out of the airflow on the sides of the car's tub as possible, although it was still wider than the 120° V6 and 90° V8s of the competition.

The centre of the engine was a magnesium crankcase cast in two halves split vertically along the centre-line of the crankshaft. The crankcase carried a one-piece crankshaft in nine main bearings. The eight aluminum cylinder barrels had their bores treated with a spray-on molybdenum/steel coating called Ferral. Each finned cylinder had its own separate aluminum cylinder head, with four studs per cylinder holding the heads and barrels to the crankcase. An aluminum valve-gear cover cast as a single piece stabilized the four cylinders on each side of the engine.

The valvetrain was similar in some respects to that designed by Ernst Fuhrmann for the Type 547 four-cylinder engine. There were two overhead camshafts per cylinder bank, operating two valves per cylinder. As with the 547, the cams were driven by shafts rather than gears or chains, and the cam lobes were separate pieces that were keyed onto the shaft. The 753 added a second countershaft above the crankshaft to the single one underneath the crankshaft in the 547. Both countershafts rotated at half crankshaft speed. Two layshafts from the upper countershaft drove the left and right intake camshafts, while two other layshafts from the lower countershaft drove the exhaust camshafts, eliminating the vertical shafts in the 547's cylinder heads that gave that engine one of its nicknames. A short vertical shaft from the bevel gear on the right-hand inlet camshaft drove the axial cooling fan at 0.92x crankshaft speed. The valvetrain was designed to operate reliably at up to 10,000 rpm.

The engine had a dry sump system with a separate oil tank. A Bosch dual ignition system with four ignition coils and two distributors fired two spark plugs per cylinder. The air-fuel mixture was delivered by four  Weber double downdraft carburetors; two on each side.

Assembly of the engine was a time consuming job, often requiring repeated assembly and disassembly with extensive hand-fitting of components. Building and setting up a 753 never took less than 100 hours and could take up to 220 hours.

A prototype engine was first started on a test-bench on 12 December 1960. Initial power output was disappointing;  (some sources say ), when the target had been .

Mezger and his team worked to improve both the engine's reliability and power output. The earliest engines had a 90° angle between the valves. When this was reduced, first to 84° and subsequently to 72°, power output rose. Other changes included reshaping the combustion chamber, lightening crankpins, and switching to titanium connecting rods.

Although the chassis of the Type 787 F1 car was lengthened to accommodate the 753, the flat-eight was never installed and the car used the 547 throughout its short life. The 753 engine debuted in Porsche's Formula One Type 804 on 20 May 1962 at the Dutch Grand Prix at Zandvoort. With a compression ratio of 10.0:1, the engine produced  at 9200 rpm on its first outing. This was still less power than the new Coventry-Climax and BRM V8 engines.

The 753 delivered Porsche's only F1 win as a constructor at the 1962 French Grand Prix at Rouen-Les-Essarts, in an 804 driven by Dan Gurney.

A short-stroke version of the engine was developed, designated the 753/1. The 753 also influenced the design of the engine for Porsche's 901 project, which would become the 911.

Technical summary

Applications
Porsche 804

References

Porsche
1962 in Formula One
Formula One engines
Porsche in motorsport
Boxer engines
Engines by model
Gasoline engines by model